Canberra United Football Club is an Australian professional soccer club based in the southern Canberra suburb of Wanniassa, Australian Capital Territory. Founded in 2008 by Capital Football, the club was an inaugural member of the W-League and the only club not affiliated with an A-League Men team. Canberra United currently competes in the A-League Women, A-League Youth and NPLW leagues. Canberra's home stadium is McKellar Park and the club is a two-time champion and three-time premier of the W-League.

W-League History

2008–09 Season

The first announcement of the club came in July 2008, coinciding with the establishment of the new W-League.  The formation of the new club presented a unique situation in the league, that it was not associated with an established A-League side.  In August, Canberra appointed Matildas assistant coach Robbie Hooker as coach for the inaugural season, and ACT Senator Kate Lundy as club chair.   United also announced its first key signing in local Canberran and Matildas goalkeeper Lydia Williams.  Hooker made a number of key signings in the first registration window, also securing Caitlin Munoz, Amy Chapman, Grace Gill-McGrath, Hayley Crawford, Rhian Davies, Thea Slatyer for the inaugural season.  The squad was further expanded in the lead up to the first round, signing on a number of players from the ACT and Southern NSW, and also signing Sasha McDonnell and Kara Mowbray from Queensland.  The final squad presented significant strength on paper, boasting eight full internationals and a further four Young Matildas.

United started the season steadily, alternating losses and wins in the opening rounds, including a win over eventual Premiers Queensland Roar.  Scoring came with some difficulty for the side, with four goals in their opening first five matches.  Influencing this record was an injury to striker Caitlin Munoz in Round 1, keeping her sidelined for a number of weeks.  Munoz's return to the side in Round 6 immediately lifted the scoring rate, contributing four goals in the last five rounds.  Despite early losses, Canberra were unbeaten in the last seven rounds of the competition, achieving a third-placed finish with a record of four wins, four draws and two losses.  Canberra's strength throughout the season has been in defence, drawn from a number of experienced players.  In front of a dependable Williams in goal, a defensive backline led by Thea Slatyer and captain Ellie Brush frustrated opposition and ensured the second-best defensive record in the competition, bettered only by Premiers Queensland.

United won their away semi-final against Newcastle Jets, and progressed to the inaugural final, where they were defeated by Queensland Roar.

2009 season

There were a number of changes at Canberra for their second season, most notably the departure of Robbie Hooker and appointment of Ray Junna as coach.  Junna has commenced preparations for the new season to establish a new squad, and has retained most of the locally based players.  Star striker from the previous season Caitlin Munoz is unable to play this season due to a knee operation, but has accepted an assistant coach role with Junna.

2013–14 season
Before the season the team appointed Liesbeth Migchelsen, a former Dutch International, as head coach and Raeanne Dower as assistant coach.

2014–15 season
Canberra United booked their place in the W-league Finals series with the most unlikely of wins over Premiers Perth Glory in the final match of the regular season. United needed at least 1 point to make the finals but faced off against the hardest of opponents in the Glory who had run away with the Premiership title with ten wins from eleven matches heading into the final match at Viking Park, Canberra. Things did not seem like they were going to plan when United went behind in the 53rd minute but they came from behind with goals to Heyman & Sykes clinching third spot in the league and finals football.

Canberra United drew Melbourne Victory for the W-League semi-finals and headed down to Kardinia Park in Geelong to square off for the right to line up in the Final. American import, Chantel Jones, proved to be the influential winner as United progressed to the Grand Final thanks to her glovesmenship in a tightly fought penalty shootout after the match ended nill – nill. Chantel revealed after the match she chose to go left in the Victory's final penalty kick because their previous four penalties also went to the left hand side. This proved a treat as Jones saved the shot before guest signing, Kendall Fletcher, stepped up to slot the final shot into the net and book the girls from the Capital a ticket to the Grand Final.

United came up against familiar foe in the Grand Final as they faced the Premiers Perth Glory for the second time in three matches. the Glory were heavy favourites leading into the match after setting a string of records including most goals scored, most points accumulated, highest winning streak to start the season and getting the privilege to play at home for the final at Perth Oval. But it was United who would cause a boilover in the west to secure their second Championship in the club's history. United opened the scoring with a pulsating strike by Stephanie Ochs but the Glory pulled level through their own long range strike by Shelina Zadorsky. This set the stage for a tense finish to the match and the 2,671 fans were treated to some football drama as just when it looked like the Glory would go on with things and get a second, it was in fact the visitors who snatched a second goal through the ever reliable Ashleigh Sykes. A minute later Perth had won a penalty and up stepped Australia international Kate Gill to take the shot. Chantel Jones stood strong and pulled off a good save to keep United in the lead which was duly doubled a minute later as Sykes grabbed her Grand Final brace and secured the title for Canberra. Canberra did miss a penalty in stoppage time with Mackenzie Arnold saving Grace Gill's shot but it was already all over by that stage.

2015–16 season
Reigning champions Canberra United have signed up 5 new players for the 2015–16 season. These include Mexican international Veronica Perez, New Zealand forward Emma Kete, Emma Checker, Jenna McCormick and rookie Nickoletta Flannery. Veronica Perez is the first Mexican international to play in the W-League. Emma Kete is also returning to the club after previously have won the W-League title in its 4th season. Meanwhile, Nickoletta Flannery is a local Canberra product who has been in tremendous form. Goalkeeper Lydia Williams is back in the squad, returning from a knee injury that put her out of action last season. Canberra United's leading goalscorer of all time, Michelle Heyman also signed on for a 6th successive year with the club.

Club identity

Colours and badge
The primary club colour of Canberra United is green, chosen principally since it did not clash with the other seven clubs in the inaugural competition.  They are the second elite sporting team from the city to wear a green jersey after National Rugby League club, Canberra Raiders.  This has led to some cross-promotion between the two 'green machine' teams. The Canberra United badge depicts the flagpole of Parliament House, a symbol of Canberra.

Stadium

Canberra's current home ground for W-League home matches is Viking Park, a multi-purpose stadium within the Tuggeranong region in Canberra's south. The stadium has a grand stand and hills surrounding a rectangular playing surface. The capacity for Viking Park is 7,000 with 1,000 seats in the grand stand. United moved into Viking Park at the beginning of the 2020/21 W-League season following the closure of McKellar Park by the owner due to COVID-19. Canberra United's maiden home ground was McKellar Park, a purpose built football ground within the Belconnen region in Canberra's north-west. The club played at McKellar for seven years with a handful of matches played at alternative grounds including: Deakin Stadium, AIS Enclosed, Viking Park and Canberra Stadium. The FFA partnered United with Central Coast Mariners in 2009 and 2016/17 to feature in 'double-header' W-League and A-League fixtures at Canberra Stadium.

Supporters
Canberra United had the highest attendance in the W-League in the inaugural season with an average crowd of 1,029. Their first home match attracted a crowd of 1,637 against Central Coast Mariners (9 November 2008).

The largest attendance to watch a Westfield W-League match at McKellar Park was 2,512 for the Grand Final against Brisbane Roar (28 January 2012).

The largest attendance to watch a Westfield W-League match at Canberra Stadium was 2,595 against Melbourne City (12 November 2016).

Sponsors

Personnel

Current squad

Club officials
Current as of 30 January 2017

Head coaches
Current as of 17 September 2021

Honours
 W-League:
  W-League Champions (2): 2011–12, 2014–15
  Runners-up (1): 2008–09
  W-League Premiers (3): 2011–12, 2013–14, 2016–17
  Runners-up (1): 2015–16

Records

Academy and Youth

The Canberra United Academy was set up in 2016 to represent the Capital Football High Performance Program, aligned with the FFA national technical strategy, catering for players from the ACT and the surrounding region. Originally the Academy ran programs for both girls and boys from U-10 to first grade.  The boys program was met with opposition by the established ACT NPL clubs, who believed the Academy would take their best young players. The Clubs lobbied and threatened to break-away and establish a new league if the Academy was not removed from the first grade Capital Football NPL league. In 2017, after just one season, the boys program was amalgamated with the FFA Centre of Excellence program. As of 2020, the Academy runs girls and women's programs including U-13, U-15, U-17, Reserves and First Grade at NPLW level.

In addition, the Academy also runs a men's U-23 Y-League program, having been granted a National Youth League licence from the 2017–18 season onwards.

Season-by-season results

See also
 List of top-division football clubs in AFC countries
 Women's soccer in Australia
 W-League (Australia) all-time records
 Australia women's national soccer team

References

External links

Canberra United website
Capital Football website
W-League Official Website

Women's soccer clubs in Australia
A-League Women teams
Soccer clubs in Canberra
Association football clubs established in 2008
2008 establishments in Australia
Canberra United FC